This is a list of career statistics of Puerto Rican professional tennis player Monica Puig since her professional debut in September 2010. Puig won one WTA singles title, plus the gold medal in the women's singles tournament at the 2016 Summer Olympics.

Performance timelines

Only main-draw results in WTA Tour, Grand Slam tournaments, Fed Cup and Olympic Games are included in win–loss records.

Singles
Current through the 2022 Madrid Open.

Doubles

Notes

 Grand Slam performances, overall win–loss, prize money earned source

Significant finals

Olympic finals

Singles: 1 (gold medal)

WTA career finals

Singles: 3 (1 title, 2 runner-ups)

ITF finals

Singles: 10 (6 titles, 4 runner-ups)

Doubles: 1 (runner-up)

Notes

 Matches sourced per ITF

Regional championship medal matches

Central American and Caribbean Games

Singles: 3 (3 gold medals)

Doubles: 1 (bronze medal)

Mixed doubles: 1 (bronze medal)

Pan American Games

Singles: 2 (1 silver medal, 1 bronze medal)

Junior Grand Slam finals

Girls' singles: 2 (2 runner-ups)

Record against top 10 players
Puig's match record against players who have been ranked in the top 10 of the WTA Singles Rankings. Active players are in boldface. (main draw results only)

Wins over top 10 players

See also

List of Puerto Ricans
Sports in Puerto Rico
Puerto Rico at the Olympics

References

External links 

 
 
 
 Rio 2016 Olympic Tennis Event: Women's Singles Bracket
 Mónica Puig: Profile at Rio Olympics Website 

Puig, Mónica